Leasam Heronry Wood is a  biological Site of Special Scientific Interest north-west of Rye in East Sussex.

This wood is not long established but it contains a nationally important heronry. The birds began to use the site in 1935 and have bred there since 1940. There are over fifty breeding pairs, around 1% of the British population.

The site is private land with no public access.

References

Sites of Special Scientific Interest in East Sussex